Sabrina Anijs is a model and a Dutch beauty queen. She was crowned as Miss Benelux 2009 in October 2008. She represented the Netherlands in the Miss Earth 2009 pageant, which was held in October 2009.

Miss Benelux 2009
Anijs, who was born and raised in Netherlands, was crowned Miss Benelux 2009 during an event held on October 4, 2008, in Belgium, which participated by 40 contestants from Belgium, Netherlands and Luxembourg. She eventually hopes to make the transition of working into a law profession. Besides her studies, Anijs also works part-time for the customer of a cable company. Her pageant court includes Miss Benelux Belgium, Isabel Van Hoof and Theodora Banica as Miss Benelux Luxembourg.

She will represent the Netherlands in the Miss Earth 2009 beauty pageant in the Philippines, which probably be held in October to November 2009.

Miss India Holland 2005
On June 4, 2005, Anijs participated in the Miss India Holland 2005, which is an annual beauty contest for ladies of Hindustan origin. The pageant consisted of a number of rounds including the gala round for fashion clothing, talent round, and Indian national costume competition. She placed second runner up in the event.

See also
Miss Earth
Femina Miss India
Miss Earth 2009

References

External links
Official Website
Official Miss Earth Website

Living people
Miss Earth 2009 contestants
Dutch beauty pageant winners
Year of birth missing (living people)